The New Rusyn Times  is the English-language membership publication of the Carpatho-Rusyn Society, an American nonprofit organization promoting Rusyn culture in the United States as well in the homeland in east Eastern Europe.

Established in 1994 in Pittsburgh, Pennsylvania, The New Rusyn Times is published quarterly. It was previously published on a bimonthly basis. The current editor is Iva Fedorka.

See also
Ruthenia
Carpathian Ruthenia

References

External links
Carpatho-Rusyn Society Web site

1994 establishments in Pennsylvania
Bimonthly magazines published in the United States
Cultural magazines published in the United States
Local interest magazines published in the United States
Magazines established in 1994
Magazines published in Pittsburgh
Quarterly magazines published in the United States
Rusyn-American culture in Pennsylvania
Rusyn-American history
Rusyn culture